WTJX-FM (93.1 MHz) is a non-commercial, educational public radio station, serving as the NPR network affiliate for the United States Virgin Islands. The station is licensed to Charlotte Amalie. The station is owned and operated by the Virgin Islands Public Broadcasting System, which also owns sister station WTJX-TV, a PBS affiliate.

The station signed on the air on January 12, 2015.

External links
 Official Website
 

TJX-FM
Radio stations established in 2015
2015 establishments in the United States Virgin Islands
NPR member stations
Charlotte Amalie, U.S. Virgin Islands
Public broadcasting in insular areas of the United States